Byliny may refer to:
Byliny, plural of bylina, a traditional East-Slavic narrative poem
Byliny, Warmian-Masurian Voivodeship (north Poland)